The order of precedence in Argentina is a symbolic hierarchy of officials used to direct protocol. It is regulated by Presidential Decree 2072 of 10 October 1993, signed by then President Carlos Menem, and former ministers Guido di Tella and Carlos Ruckauf.

The order of succession should the presidency unexpectedly become vacant is specified by Law 25716 of 2002.

Order of precedence 
Precedence is determined  by the office; names of incumbents  are listed.
President of the Nation (Alberto Fernández)
Vice President of the Nation (Cristina Fernández de Kirchner)
Provisional President of the Senate (Claudia Ledesma Abdala)
President of the Chamber of Deputies (Cecilia Moreau)
President of the Supreme Court (Justice Horacio Rosatti)
Living former Presidents of the Nation in order of seniority
Isabel Perón
Adolfo Rodríguez Saá
Eduardo Duhalde
Cristina Fernández de Kirchner (appears above as Vice President)
Mauricio Macri
Provincial Governors and the Chief of Government of Buenos Aires
Chief of the Cabinet of Ministers (Juan Luis Manzur)
National Cabinet Ministers
General Secretary of the Presidency of the Nation (Julio Vitobello)
Chief of Staff of the Armed Forces (Lt. Gen. (Air Force) Jorge Alberto Chevalier)
Commanders of each armed force (Navy, Air Force and Army)
Ministers of the Supreme Court
General Prosecutor of the Nation (Alejandra Gils Carbó)
National Prosecutor for Administrative Investigations (Sergio Rodríguez)
Secretaries of the Presidency of the Nation
Chief of the Casa Militar
Vice presidents of both chambers of the National Congress
Provincial Vice-governors
Argentine ambassadors in office abroad
Cardinals
President of the Argentine Episcopal Conference (Archbishop José María Arancedo)
Archbishop of Buenos Aires (Mario Poli)
Presidents of each parliamentary bloc at the Senate and the Chamber of Deputies of the Nation
National Senators and National Deputies
Archbishops
Vice presidents of Provincial Senates and Chambers of Deputies
Presidents of Provincial Supreme Courts
Major Generals of the Army
Rear Admirals - Upper Half
Major Generals of the Air Force
Argentine Ambassadors based in Argentina
President of the National Criminal Court of Appeals (Judge Juan Carlos Rodríguez Basavilbaso)
Presidents of National and Federal Courts of Appeals
Bishops and their equivalents in other officially recognised religions
Secretaries at the National Congress
Members of the National Court of Criminal Appeals
Members of National and Federal Courts of Appeals
Undersecretaries of State
Undersecretary of the Treasury
Commander of the Argentine Federal Police (Commissioner-Major Néstor Vallecca)
Commander of the Argentine National Gendarmerie (Commandant-general Héctor Bernabé Schenone)
Commander of the Argentine Naval Prefecture (Prefect Oscar Adolfo Arce)
Brigade Generals of the Army
Rear Admirals - Lower Half
Brigade Generals of the Air Force
Argentine Chargé d'affaires in office abroad
Secretaries at the Supreme Court
Federal and National Judges
National Directors
Rectors of National Universities
Presidents of National Academies
President of the Central Bank of Argentina (Miguel Ángel Pesce)
President of the Banco de la Nación Argentina (Eduardo Hecker)
Presidents of state-owned companies (reparticiones autárquicas)
Deputy Rectors of National Universities
General Directors
Argentine Consuls in office abroad
Argentine diplomatic Attachés in office abroad
Director of the Argentine National Library (Juan Sasturain)
Director of National Museums 
Deans of National Faculties
Presidents of National Professional Associations

Order of succession
The order of succession should the presidency unexpectedly become vacant is specified by Law 25716 of 2002:
 The Vice President
 The Provisional President of the Senate
 The President of the Chamber of Deputies
 The President of the Supreme Court of Justice
until Congress designates a president according to article 88 of the Constitution of Argentina.

References

Argentina
Government of Argentina